Bilal Hassan (born 15 April 1990) is a Ugandan cricketer who plays for the Uganda national cricket team.

In April 2018, he was named in Uganda's squad for the 2018 ICC World Cricket League Division Four tournament in Malaysia. He played in Uganda's opening match of the tournament, against Malaysia.

In July 2018, he was part of Uganda's squad in the Eastern sub region group for the 2018–19 ICC World Twenty20 Africa Qualifier tournament. In September 2018, he was named in Uganda's squad for the 2018 Africa T20 Cup. He made his Twenty20 debut for Uganda in the 2018 Africa T20 Cup on 14 September 2018.

In October 2018, he was named in Uganda's squad for the 2018 ICC World Cricket League Division Three tournament in Oman. In July 2019, he was one of twenty-five players named in the Ugandan training squad, ahead of the Cricket World Cup Challenge League fixtures in Oman. In November 2019, he was named in Uganda's squad for the Cricket World Cup Challenge League B tournament in Oman. He made his List A debut, for Uganda against Jersey, on 2 December 2019.

In August 2021, he was named in Uganda's Twenty20 International (T20I) squad for the 2021–22 Uganda Tri-Nation Series. He made his T20I debut on 10 September 2021, for Uganda against Kenya. In November 2021, he was named in Uganda's squad for the Regional Final of the 2021 ICC Men's T20 World Cup Africa Qualifier tournament in Rwanda.

References

External links
 

1990 births
Living people
Ugandan cricketers
Uganda Twenty20 International cricketers
Place of birth missing (living people)
Pakistani emigrants to Uganda